The Laleli Dam is an embankment dam, currently under construction near the town of Laleli on the Çoruh River in Erzurum Province, Turkey. The primary purpose of the dam is hydroelectric power production. The dam, which will power a 99 MW power station, will also flood several villages to include Laleli. The dam's reservoir will stretch east into Bayburt Province.

References

External links

Dams in Erzurum Province
Hydroelectric power stations in Turkey
Dams on the Çoruh River
Dams under construction
Rock-filled dams